MV Iyanough is a high-speed ferry that operates for the Steamship Authority on a route between Hyannis and Nantucket, Massachusetts.

Iyanough was built by Gladding-Hearn Shipbuilding to an Incat Crowther design at a cost of $9.7 million and was delivered to the Authority in January 2007.  She was christened and commissioned into service during a ceremony on Nantucket Island on March 24, 2007.

On the night of June 16, 2017, Iyanough crashed into a jetty in Hyannis harbor, injuring nine passengers. 

She is powered by four MTU diesel engines, which give her a top speed of  when fully loaded. She has a passenger capacity of 393, with 350 indoor seats and 40 on the outer deck.

References

Ferries of Massachusetts
Ships built in Somerset, Massachusetts
2007 ships